The Charleston, Cincinnati and Chicago or Triple C Rail Trail is a rail trail in the Piedmont region of north-central South Carolina.

The trail begins just west of Tirzah, runs west through  York, James Ross Wildlife Reservation (a South Carolina Department of Natural Resources Wildlife Management Area),  Sharon,  Hickory Grove, Smyrna, and ends near Kings Creek.

Please note, as of 4/18/15 all sections of this trail (except for the part shared by the paved York Bicycle Trail) are so overgrown as to be impassible. Also there is no signage of any kind signifying it exits at all. Use discretion. Passable sections are indicated in Google Maps as dirt bicycle trails - 7/25/16 route does get overgrown as SCDOT does not maintain the trail although owns the full right of way, which is indicated by county GIS maps.

Route

The trail is located wholly within York and Cherokee counties.

The trail roughly parallels Highway 161 in a westerly direction for about  until it reaches the city of York. Heading southwest out of york the trail passes under the Kings Mountain Railroad Trail and US Route 321. The trail strikes out through woodlands west of York as it heads towards Sharon. Along the way it passes through the James Ross Wildlife Reservation.

Just before entering Hickory Grove, the trail moves eastward to run through the east side of town. North of Hickory Grove, the trail parallels South Carolina Highway 97 for approximately  until the trail reaches the town of Smyrna. Beyond Smyrna the trail enters Cherokee County and roughly parallels SC Hwy 97 until the trail ends near the intersection of Hollifield Drive and Manning Road near Kings Creek.

Cities, Towns and attractions located along or near the trail (from east to west):

 Tirzah
 York
 Kings Mtn Railroad Trail in York
 James Ross Wildlife Reservation
 Sharon
 Hill's Mercantile
 Hickory Grove
 Smyrna - The smallest town in South Carolina
 Kings Creek

History

The trail runs along the abandoned right of way of the Charleston, Cincinnati and Chicago Railroad, or Triple C. The section of railroad between Tirzah and Smyrna was constructed between 1886 and 1889.

After a series of reorganizations, the railroad became a part of the Southern Railway and eventually Norfolk Southern. Freight and passenger service continued for many years. In the mid-1980s, Norfolk Southern ended rail service between York and Smyrna. Then again in the late 1980s Norfolk Southern ended service between York and Tirzah. The tracks were removed, and the first section of the Triple C Rail Trail opened as part of the York Bicycle Trail in the late 1990s. Around the same time a second portion was opened across the James Ross Wildlife Reservation. The trail continued opening in stages with the most recent section (near Kings Creek, South Carolina) being completed in 2007. The trail is operated by the City of York, the South Carolina Department of Natural Resources and SCDOT.

Activities

The trail is relatively flat with only gentle grades. It is topped with crushed limestone along most of the trail and Asphalt within the city of York. Bicycling and hiking are extremely popular during the spring, summer, and fall. Horseback riding is allowed on the western end of the trail, between Kings Creek and Smyrna. The trail intersects with two other hiking trails, including the Kings Mtn Railroad Trail.

Wildlife viewing is also popular. Hawks and other large birds are commonly seen along the trail. Canada geese and ducks are also common. wild turkeys and white-tailed deer live in the wooded areas and are seen along the trail.

Motorized vehicles are strictly forbidden from using the trail. This ban includes motorcycles, snowmobiles and all-terrain vehicles.

Camping is currently not allowed along the trail. Numerous lodging establishments are available in York. Hunting of white-tailed deer, wild turkey, small game and furbearers is allowed within the James Ross Wildlife Reservation, authorization is needed from the SCDNR.

Parking areas are available at several locations along the entire length of the trail. Trail users should carry enough water to last for the duration of their trips, as potable water is not readily available. The City of York offers a full array of services and supplies. Restaurants are located in York and Sharon. Gasoline and other supplies are available at general stores located in York, Sharon and Hickory Grove.

Future expansion
The last section of the trail to open was in 2007, and there are no immediate plans to expand the trail at this time. However, several future plans exist, including one to incorporate portions of the trail, along with an extension to Rock Hill, as part of the Carolina Thread Trail

See also
 List of rail trails in South Carolina
 Carolina Thread Trail

References

External links
 South Carolina Department of Natural Resources - James Ross Wildlife Reservation 
  Abandoned Rails - Wateree to Kings Creek
 City of York recreation facilities 
 Knights Inn Hotel  (located in York)
 York Motor Lodge info on Discover South Carolina  (located closest to trail)

Hiking trails in South Carolina
Protected areas of Cherokee County, South Carolina
Protected areas of York County, South Carolina
Mountain biking venues in the United States
Rail trails in South Carolina
Parks in South Carolina
Transportation in York County, South Carolina
Bike paths in South Carolina
Urban planning in the United States
Horse trails